Harald Faderbauer (born 24 July 1966) is an Austrian rower. He competed at the 1988 Summer Olympics and the 1992 Summer Olympics.

References

1966 births
Living people
Austrian male rowers
Olympic rowers of Austria
Rowers at the 1988 Summer Olympics
Rowers at the 1992 Summer Olympics
Sportspeople from Vienna